Garudinodes castaneus is a moth of the family Erebidae. It was described by Rothschild in 1912. It is found in New Guinea.

References

 Natural History Museum Lepidoptera generic names catalog

Nudariina
Moths described in 1912